The SRTM Water Body Data (SWBD) is a geographical dataset (2003) encoding high-resolution worldwide coastline outlines in a vector format, published by NASA and designed for use in geographic information systems and mapping applications. It was created by BAE Systems ADR for the US National Geospatial-Intelligence Agency (NGA) as a complementary product during editing of the digital elevation model database of the Shuttle Radar Topography Mission (SRTM). SWBD data covers the Earth's surface between 56° southern latitude and 60° northern latitude. It is distributed in ESRI shapefile format, divided into 12,229 files, each covering one 1°-by-1° tile of the Earth's surface.

SWBD data is in the public domain and is made available online for free download by NASA.

External links
 SWBD data download site

References
 Shuttle Radar Topography Mission

Geographic information systems
National Geospatial-Intelligence Agency